Tomás Oscar Badaloni (born 2 May 2000) is an Argentine professional footballer who plays as a centre-forward for Godoy Cruz.

Career
After playing futsal with Alianza Guaymallén, Badaloni signed for local team Club Leonardo Murialdo in 2012 before moving to Godoy Cruz in 2016. His first experience of first-team football came in May 2018, with Diego Dabove selecting him as substitute for Primera División fixtures with River Plate and Argentinos Juniors; though he didn't come on. Badaloni was again on the bench in July 2019 versus Huracán in the Copa Argentina, prior to appearing for his professional debut against San Lorenzo on 27 July under Lucas Bernardi; playing for the full duration of a 3–2 defeat, with the centre-forward scoring his first goal in the process.

Career statistics
.

Notes

References

External links

2000 births
Living people
Sportspeople from Mendoza, Argentina
Argentine people of Italian descent
Argentine footballers
Association football forwards
Argentine Primera División players
Godoy Cruz Antonio Tomba footballers